Sridevi: The Eternal Screen Goddess is a biography by author and screenwriter Satyarth Nayak that chronicles the life and career of Indian actress Sridevi. Consisting of ten chapters, it describes her birth in 1963 in Egmore, her acting career in both the North and South Indian film industry, her marriage in 1996 to the film producer Boney Kapoor, with whom she has two daughters, and her death by accidental drowning in 2018. Published by Random House on 16 December 2019, the book was a success both commercially and critically, and reviewers commended it for the writing and comprehensiveness.

After authoring the mystery novel The Emperor's Riddles (2014) and scripting the historical television series Porus (2017–2018), Nayak wanted to experiment in writing a biography. 2017 was the year of Sridevi's 300th film, Mom; the news of the milestone aroused him to choose the actress as his next subject. Discussion of the book was started the same year, but writing started in mid-2018—following her death in February 2018—and was finished in around  years. In research, Nayak used his personal collection of film magazines and interviewed approximately 70 people, including her family members, her contemporaries and her friends.

Summary 
Sridevi was born on 13 August 1963 in Egmore. She got her first film role in the Tamil-language film Thunaivan (1969), portraying the Hindu God Kartikeya. She then appeared in more South Indian films, with her Malayalam and Telugu debuts Kumara Sambhavam (1969) and Maa Nanna Nirdoshi (1970), respectively. In Bollywood, she made her debut with Rani Mera Naam (1972), and followed it by a debut in the Kannada cinema with Bhakta Kumbara. The book also covers her commercially and critically successful films such as Moondru Mudichu (1976), 16 Vayathinile (1977), Sigappu Rojakkal (1978), Sadma (1983), Mr. India (1987), Chandni (1989), ChaalBaaz (1989), Kshana Kshanam (1991), and Lamhe (1991). In 1996, she married the film producer Boney Kapoor, with whom she has two children (including Jahnvi). After having children, Sridevi took a sabbatical from full-time acting. She had her comeback in English Vinglish (2012) and her last starring role came with Mom (2017). The book also details her death by accidental drowning on 24 February 2018.

Background and writing 

2017 marked the release of Sridevi's 300th film, the crime thriller Mom, for which she won her only Best Actress trophy at the National Film Awards. At that time, the author Satyarth Nayak had left Mumbai for Delhi and planned to explore a new genre for his next project, having written the mystery novel The Emperor's Riddles (2014) and scripted the historical television series Porus (2017–2018). The news of her milestone aroused Nayak to write about the actress. Calling himself an "ardent admirer" of Sridevi, whom he described as "a true pan-Indian megastar", Nayak's first encounter with Sridevi happened in 2012, while she was promoting for her comeback film, English Vinglish in Delhi, and had become an unforgettable experience for him.

Nayak was surprised to learn there were no biographies on her written at the time, and considered writing it would be a "blissful experience" for him. In 2017, he met her husband, Boney Kapoor, to discuss her biography. Coinciding with Jahnvi's signing of her debut film, Dhadak (2018), Sridevi notified him to start the project after the film was released. However, her sudden death in February 2018 changed his mind. Nayak recounted that he was initially ready to remove the "Sridevi Book" folder from his laptop until his friend texted him to keep the ideas, as her death meant the book would have a last chapter. He added, "While the initial idea of this book had been discussed with her and Boney sir, post her untimely demise, it's now taken the shape and form of a tribute to her inspiring cinematic journey. I am grateful to both Boney sir and Penguin for turning my vision into reality."

The writing of the book, originally titled Sridevi: Girl Woman Superstar, started in mid-2018 and was finished in  years. Nayak revealed that Kapoor was his huge supporter throughout the process and helped him to get access to anyone ready to interview. Nayak conducted meetings with over 70 people, including Sridevi's film contemporaries, her friends, her family members, and those who were present in Dubai, where she died. He stated he tried watching Sridevi's films as many as he could to "ensure a comprehensive documentation of her journey." In research, he used his personal collection of film magazines from the 1980s and 1990s, which contain her interviews from various stages of her career, and considered them "her voice in [the] book." Kapoor recommended Kajol to write the foreword, to which Nayak agreed. According to Nayak, the foreword needed to be written by a younger individual who works in the Indian film industry to give comprehension of how Sridevi being her inspiration, and Kajol fit the requirements.

Release and reception 
Sridevi: The Eternal Screen Goddess was published by Random House on 16 December 2019 on hardcover, and was declared a commercial success. Two more versions, on Amazon Kindle and audiobook, were released on 20 December that year and 12 February 2021, respectively. Upon release, the book has generated widespread acclaim from critics, who generally praise Nayak's writing and its comprehensiveness. Priyanka Bhadani of The Week, referring to the book as a "convincing retelling," complimented his effort in researching for it and concluded the review by saying, "even if the tone of the book is adulatory to an extent, it is a sincere effort in putting together the life of an actor who remained an enigma till the end." Writing for the Khaleej Times, Sadiq Saleem described it as an "eye-opening book," calling it "no less than a treasure for any cine-goer."

The Hindu Ramya Kannan wrote that the book is more like a hagiography than a biography. Reviewing ambivalently the book for India Today, Jai Arjun Singh found Nayak's writing repetitive when starting his sentences by words such as, "Watch how..." Singh criticised his selectiveness in examining her performances, claiming that Nayak avoided those that have more negative reviews. The Times of India believed his journalistic career contributed with giving him enough insights about Sridevi, and Priyanka Chandani of The Asian Age said that it is full of her anecdotes. In the words of Gautam Chintamani from Firstpost, "... the actor's all-round brilliance is meticulously encapsulated, bringing forth episodes from her life that reveal a great deal about the person she was." Mid-Day Mayank Shekhar called the book well-researched and "entirely fan-zoned."

Publication history

References

Sources

External links 
 

2019 non-fiction books
Biographies about actors
Indian biographies
Indian non-fiction books
Random House books